Schallstadt is a town in the district of Breisgau-Hochschwarzwald in Baden-Württemberg in Germany. It is known for its wine production and celebrates an annual wine festival in late summer.

Personalities

Sons and Daughters of the Community 
 Karl Frey (1886–1987), teacher and businessman, Senator of the South African Union
 Martin Waldseemüller (c. 1470–1520), cartographer, name giver of America

Other personalities 
 Uwe Wassmer (born 1966), former football player

References

Breisgau-Hochschwarzwald
Baden